Jonathan Gary Smith (born 28 July 1997) is an English professional footballer who plays as a winger for League One club Burton Albion.

Career

Wrexham
Born in Liverpool, England, Smith joined the Wrexham academy at the age of 10. On 16 January 2016, Smith made his Wrexham debut in their FA Trophy second round defeat against Torquay United.

Bristol City
In May 2016, Smith signed for Championship side Bristol City for an "undisclosed" compensation fee, agreeing terms on a two-year contract. On 19 August 2016, Smith joined League Two side Cheltenham Town on loan until January 2017. Smith made his English Football League debut the following day in a 1–0 defeat against Doncaster Rovers. He made 9 appearances whilst on loan at Cheltenham Town.

He moved on loan to Tranmere Rovers in July 2018, and signed a new one-year contract at Bristol City to take him to June 2020.

He joined Oldham Athletic on a season-long loan in September 2019.

On 29 August 2020, Smith joined Swindon Town on a season-long loan. He scored on his Swindon debut in an EFL Cup tie against Charlton Athletic on 5 September 2020 before being recalled on 29 January having made 20 appearances in all competitions.

Burton Albion
On 29 January 2021, Smith joined League One side Burton Albion on a two-and-a-half year deal for an undisclosed fee.  On 6 February 2021 he made his debut in a EFL League One match against Hull City scoring the only goal 1-0.

Career statistics

References

External links

1997 births
Living people
English footballers
Footballers from Liverpool
Association football midfielders
Wrexham A.F.C. players
Bristol City F.C. players
Cheltenham Town F.C. players
AFC Fylde players
Tranmere Rovers F.C. players
Oldham Athletic A.F.C. players
Swindon Town F.C. players
Burton Albion F.C. players
National League (English football) players
English Football League players